Rabbi Moshe-Zvi Neria (29 January 1913 – 12 December 1995) was an Israeli educator, writer, and rosh yeshiva who served as a member of the Knesset for the National Religious Party between 1969 and 1974. Neria established and headed the Bnei Akiva yeshiva in Kfar Haroeh, and was one of Rabbi Abraham Isaac Kook's most influential disciples. Due to his far-reaching influence on Religious Zionism, he is known as "the father of the knit kippah generation."

Biography
Born Moshe-Zvi Menkin in Łódź in the Russian Empire (today in Poland), Neria was educated at yeshivas in Minsk and Shkloŭ. He made aliyah to Mandatory Palestine in 1930, and studied at the Mercaz HaRav yeshiva with Rabbi Abraham Isaac Kook, receiving certification as a rabbi. He also studied in the Mizrachi teachers seminary in Jerusalem. At one point he resided in the Knesset Yisrael neighborhood.

He helped establish the Bnei Akiva youth movement, and edited its publication Zra'im. In 1940 he founded the first Bnei Akiva yeshiva in Kfar Haroeh, serving as its headmaster and teaching Talmud and Jewish thought. He later established several yeshiva high schools and Hesder yeshivas for IDF soldiers. In addition, he founded the Hapoel HaMizrachi Rabbinical Association.

In 1969 he was elected to the Knesset on the National Religious Party list for one term. He left the party in 1983 to establish the Religious Zionist Camp (also known as Mazad).

Rabbi Neria died on the 19th of Kislev, 5756 (1995), at the age of 82. His last words were: "Give me kedushah (holiness), it is kedushah that I seek! The holiness of the Land of Israel, the holiness of the love of Israel, the holiness of the Nation of Israel."

Rabbi Neria and his wife Rachel had eight children. His eldest is Rabbi Nachum Neriya, rosh yeshiva of Torah Betziyon in Efrat, Israel.

Rabbi Neria's grandson is Rabbi Ariel Bareli.

Writings

When he saw that the public venerated Rav Kook but knew very little about his special approach to Torah, Rabbi Neriah published several books combining biographical material on Rav Kook together with excerpts from his writings, dealing with topics such as redemption, the rebuilding of the land of Israel, Torah and prayer. These include:

 Orot HaTefilah - on prayer
 Moadei HaRe'iyah on Shabbat and Jewish holidays
 Chayei HaRe'iyah on the period when Rav Kook was chief rabbi of Jaffa
 Likutei HaRe'iyah
 Sichot HaRe'iyah
 Bisdei HaRe'iyah
 Tal HaRe'iyah
 Mishnat HaRav - ten chapters on the foundations of Rav Kook's philosophy

Views
When asked whether a rabbi should be involved in politics. He replied, "Absolutely not. In politics, it is sometimes necessary to compromise on principles in order to accomplish important goals, and that is not a proper thing for a rabbi to do."

Awards and recognition
In 1978 he was awarded the Israel Prize for special contribution to society and the state. The Israeli settlement Neria, established in 1991, is named after him, a neighborhood in Lod (Nof Neria), and streets in Netanya, Petah Tikva, Rishon LeZion, Rehovot, Bet El, and Kfar Haroeh. Several schools were named after him, including the Hesder yeshiva in Shadmot Mehola (Shadmot Neria), Ulpanat Neria in Dimona, and Moreshet Neria in Giv'at Shmuel.

References

External links

1913 births
1995 deaths
20th-century Israeli educators
20th-century Israeli non-fiction writers
20th-century Israeli rabbis
Israel Prize for special contribution to society and the State recipients
Israeli male writers
Israeli Orthodox rabbis
Israeli spiritual writers
Jewish Israeli politicians
Jewish religious writers
Jews from the Russian Empire
Members of the 7th Knesset (1969–1974)
Mercaz HaRav alumni
National Religious Party politicians
Polish emigrants to Mandatory Palestine
Rabbinic members of the Knesset
Rabbis in Mandatory Palestine